The Institute of Promotional Marketing is a marketing organization in the United Kingdom.

Originally set up in 1933 as the British Sales Promotion Association, it was known by various names until it was awarded Institute status in 1979 as the Institute of Sales Promotion. In the UK, "Institute" is a legally protected term which is only granted to organisations that can demonstrate achievement in areas such as education, development and research.

The organisation continued to be known as the ISP until June 2010, when it changed to the Institute of Promotional Marketing.

Activities
The IPM provides professional diplomas and certificates, best-practice guidelines and legal and copy clearance advice for the promotional marketing industry in the UK. It also represents the interests of promotional marketing practitioners with regulators, government officials and politicians, both in the UK and in the European Union.

The decision to change the organisation's name from the Institute of Sales Promotion to the Institute of Promotional Marketing was the result of many years' debate. It was eventually decided that the term "sales promotion" was restrictive, because, strictly speaking, it refers to a relatively small number of techniques traditionally used only with the retail environment. While Institute members may still run some promotions that use these sales promotions techniques, the majority of the work they do involves other promotional marketing techniques.

External links
Institute Of Sales Promotion

Sales promotion
Business education
Marketing organizations
Sales professional associations
Sales Promotion